Live at the Village Vanguard Vol. II is a live album by Paul Motian's Trio 2000 + Two, recorded at the Village Vanguard and released on the German Winter & Winter label in 2008. Like his previous album, it features tenor saxophonist Chris Potter, double bassist Larry Grenadier, pianist Masabumi Kikuchi, alto saxophonist Greg Osby, and new participant Mat Maneri on viola.

Reception
The Allmusic review by Ken Dryden awarded the album 4 stars, stating: "The Vanguard audience devours this powerful music, restraining themselves until each number is complete".

Track listing
All compositions by Paul Motian except as indicated
 "Till We Meet Again" (Richard A. Whiting) - 7:11 
 "Sunflower" - 5:56 
 "The Third Walk" - 10:28 
 "Ten" - 9:13 
 "The Divider" - 9:06 
 "If You Could See Me Now" (Tadd Dameron) - 2:25 
 "Fiasco" - 10:03
Recorded at the Village Vanguard in New York City on December 8–10, 2006

Personnel
Paul Motian - drums
Chris Potter - tenor saxophone
Larry Grenadier - bass
+
Greg Osby -  alto saxophone
Mat Maneri - viola
Masabumi Kikuchi - piano

References 

2008 live albums
Paul Motian live albums
Winter & Winter Records live albums
Albums recorded at the Village Vanguard